German submarine U-463 was a Type XIV supply and replenishment U-boat ("Milchkuh") of Nazi Germany's Kriegsmarine during World War II.

Her keel was laid down on 8 March 1941 by Deutsche Werke of Kiel. She was launched on 20 December 1941 and commissioned on 2 April 1942 with Korvettenkapitän Leo Wolfbauer in command. Wolfbauer remained in charge for the boat's entire career.

Design
German Type XIV submarines were shortened versions of the Type IXDs they were based on. U-463 had a displacement of  when at the surface and  while submerged. She had two shafts and two propellers.

U-463 was not fitted with torpedo tubes or deck guns, but had two  SK C/30 anti-aircraft guns with 2500 rounds as well as a  C/30 guns with 3000 rounds. The boat had a complement of fifty-three.

Operational career
U-463 conducted five patrols. As a supply boat, she avoided combat.

First patrol
U-463 departed Kiel on her first patrol on 11 July 1942, arriving at St. Nazaire in occupied France on 3 September. She had gone the 'long' way round the British Isles, by way of the gap between Iceland and the Faeroe Islands, heading out into mid-Atlantic toward the Caribbean.

Second, third and fourth patrols
Her second foray took her into the middle of the Atlantic again, between 28 September 1942 and 11 November.

The submarine's next sortie was further south, passing the Azores on the outward journey to the north and to the south on the return. By now she was based at St. Nazaire once more.

Another uneventful patrol began on 4 March 1943, but when the U-boat returned to France on 17 April, she moved into Bordeaux.

Fifth patrol and loss
U-463s fifth patrol began with her departure from Le Verdon, (north of Bordeaux): She had barely cleared the Bay of Biscay, when she was attacked and sunk on 16 May 1943 by depth charges dropped by a British Halifax from 58 Squadron RAF Coastal Command, piloted by Wing Commander Wilfrid Oulton. All 57 of her crew died.

Wolfpacks
U-463 took part in one wolfpack, namely:
 Delphin (11 – 14 January 1943)

References

Bibliography

External links
 

German Type XIV submarines
U-boats commissioned in 1942
U-boats sunk in 1943
World War II submarines of Germany
Shipwrecks in the Bay of Biscay
1941 ships
World War II shipwrecks in the Atlantic Ocean
Ships built in Kiel
U-boats sunk by British aircraft
U-boats sunk by depth charges
Ships lost with all hands
Maritime incidents in May 1943